Fjäril'n vingad syns på Haga (The butterfly wingèd's seen in Haga) is one of Carl Michael Bellman's collection of songs called Fredmans sånger, published in 1791, where it is No. 64. The song describes Haga Park, the attractive natural setting of King Gustav III's never-completed Haga Palace just north of Stockholm. An earlier version of the song was a verse petition to obtain a job for Bellman's wife. The composition is one of the most popular of Bellman's songs, being known by many Swedes by heart. It has been recorded many times from 1904 onwards, and translated into English verse at least four times.

Context

Song

Music and verse form 

Fjäriln vingad is in  time and is marked Andante. The rhyming pattern is the alternating ABAB-CDCD. Richard Engländer writes that unlike in Bellman's parody songs, the melody is of his own composition.

Lyrics 

The song, Bellman's best known, is dedicated to Captain , who at the time was Bellman's landlord in Klarabergsgatan, Stockholm. Bellman's biographer Lars Lönnroth states that it was originally a verse petition to baron Gustaf Mauritz Armfelt to get a job for Bellman's wife Lovisa in Haga Palace, and describes the composition as a "royalistic praise text". It was written in 1770 or 1771. The later version of the song omits the Lovisa petition, and describes Haga Park, the attractive natural setting of King Gustav III's never-completed Haga Palace just north of Stockholm.

Reception and legacy 

Fjäriln vingad remains popular in Sweden, and is one of the best-known and most often sung of Bellman's songs. It is included in a list of songs that "nearly all [Swedes] can sing unaided". A chime of bells in Solna, near the Haga park described in the song, rings out the melody every hour.

An early recording was made by Gustaf Adolf Lund in Stockholm in 1904. Johanna Grüssner and Mika Pohjola recorded it in a medley with "Glimmande nymf" on their song album Nu blir sommar in 2006. In the Zecchino d'Oro in 2005, it was recorded with the Italian title Il mio cuore è un gran pallone.

The song has been translated into English by Henry Grafton Chapman III, Charles Wharton Stork, Helen Asbury, Noel Wirén, and Paul Britten Austin. It has been recorded in English by William Clauson, Martin Best, Barbro Strid, and Martin Bagge.

References

Sources

 
 
 
 
 
 
  (with facsimiles of sheet music from first editions in 1790, 1791)

External links 
 "Fjäril'n vingad syns på Haga" facsimile at Litteraturbanken
 Text on Swedish WikiSource
 English version by Charles Wharton Stork, 1917
 Oscar Lundberg recording, 1917 (track 2)
 Live 2020 studio recording of 'Bellman 2.0' theatre concert (song starts at 45:00) at Västmanlands Teater by Nikolaj Cederholm and Kåre Bjerkø with their band

Swedish songs
1791 books
Fredmans sånger